Seamus O'Muineachain is the debut album of Irish ambient musician Seamus O'Muineachain. The album was released by Psychonavigation Records in 2012 and received radio play on national stations such as the Australian Broadcasting Corporation and RTÉ.

Track listing

References

External links
 Seamus O'Muineachain on Psychonavigation Records

Jimmy Monaghan albums
2012 albums